The Central African Customs and Economic Union (UDEAC) Cup was an association football tournament contested between countries in Central Africa. The creation of the UDEAC Cup was to mark the 20th anniversary since the formation of the Union but it was considered successful and was played a further six times. The tournament open to the national teams of the Union’s member countries who were affiliated to FIFA.

The technical organisation of the tournament was entrusted to the Organising and Regulations Committee of the Central African Football Federations' Union (UNIFFAC).

After the 1990 edition, the tournament was not played in the next decade. In 2003, the same countries decided to revive the competition under another name, the CEMAC Cup.

General statistics

Winners by country

1984 UDEAC Cup
Played in Congo.

Group A

Group B

Fifth place match

Semi-finals

Third place match

Final

1985 UDEAC Cup
Played in Gabon.

Group A

Group B

Semi-finals

Third place match

Final

1986 UDEAC Cup
Played in Equatorial Guinea (Bata and Malabo).

Group A

Group B

Semi-finals

Third place match
This match between Congo and Gabon was not played as Gabon withdrew.

Final

1987 UDEAC Cup
Played in N'Djamena, Chad.

Group A

Group B

Semi-finals

Third place match

Final

1988 UDEAC Cup 

Played in Cameroon.

Group A

Group B

Semi-finals

Third place match

Final

1989 UDEAC Cup  

Played in Bangui, Central African Republic.

Group A

Group B

Playoff for the semifinal place

Semi-finals

Third place match

Final

1990 UDEAC Cup
Played in Congo.

Group A

Group B

Semi-finals

Fifth place match

Third place match

Final

See also
 CEMAC Cup

References
RSSSF archives

International association football competitions in Africa
Defunct international association football competitions in Africa
Recurring sporting events established in 1984
Recurring sporting events disestablished in 1990